Anna Mirgorodskaya (born 13 March 1980) is a former Ukrainian artistic gymnast. She competed at the 1995 World Artistic Gymnastics Championships, the 1996 European Women's Artistic Gymnastics Championships and the 1996 Summer Olympics.

Eponymous skill
Mirgorodskaya has one eponymous skill listed in the Code of Points.

See also
List of Olympic female gymnasts for Ukraine

References

1980 births
Living people
Gymnasts at the 1996 Summer Olympics
Olympic gymnasts of Ukraine
Sportspeople from Odesa
Ukrainian female artistic gymnasts
Originators of elements in artistic gymnastics
21st-century Ukrainian women